Beli Potok may refer to:
 Beli Potok (Belgrade), a suburb of Belgrade in Serbia
 Beli Potok (Knjaževac), a village in the municipality of Knjaževac, Serbia
 Beli Potok (Sokobanja), a village in the municipality of Sokobanja, Serbia
 Beli Potok (Leskovac), a village in the municipality of Leskovac, Serbia